The notion of a legally sanctioned corporation remains controversial for several reasons, most of which stem from the granting of corporations both limited liability on the part of its members and the status and rights of a legal person. Some opponents to this granting of "personhood" to an organization with no personal liability contend that it creates a legal entity with the extensive financial resources to co-opt public policy and exploit resources and populations without any moral or legal responsibility to encourage restraint.

Divisions between labor, management, and owners
Adam Smith in The Wealth of Nations criticized the joint-stock company corporate form because the separation of ownership and management could lead to inefficient management.

The context for Adam Smith's term for "companies" in The Wealth of Nations was the joint-stock company. In the 18th century, the joint-stock company was a distinct entity created by the King of Great Britain as Royal Charter trading companies. These entities were sometimes awarded legal monopoly in designated regions of the world, such as the British East India Company.

Furthermore, the context of the quote points to the complications inherent in chartered joint-stock companies. Each company had a Courts of Governors and day-to-day duties were overseen by local managers. Governor supervision of day-to-day operations was minimal and was exacerbated by the poor communications of the 18th century.

Bribery and corruption were inherent in this type of corporate model because the local managers sought to avoid close supervision by the Courts of Governors, politicians, and Prime Ministers. In these circumstances, Smith did not consider joint-stock company governance to be honest. More importantly, the East India Company demonstrated inherent flaws in the corporate form. The division between owners and managers in a joint-stock company, and the limited legal liability this division was based on guaranteed that stockholders would be apathetic about a company's activities as long as the company continued to be profitable. Just as problematic, the laws of agency upon which the corporate form was based allowed for boards of directors to be so autonomous from and unconstrained by stockholder wishes that directors became negligent and ultimately self-interested in the management of the corporation.

Psychopathic behavior
Legal Scholar and Professor of Law at the University of British Columbia Joel Bakan describes the modern corporate entity as 'an institutional psychopath' and a 'psychopathic creature.' In the documentary The Corporation, Bakan claims that corporations, when considered as natural living persons, exhibit the traits of antisocial personality disorder or psychopathy. Also in the film, Robert A. G. Monks, a former Republican Party candidate for Senate from Maine, says:

Writing for the American socialist publication Jacobin, writer and sociologist Nicole Aschoff attributes the "unscrupulous" and "sometimes deadly" behavior of corporations to the "elevation of profit above all else," which she says is "a defining feature of capitalism." She adds that "the catalog of the ethical and moral crimes of corporations is impressive":

Analogy with totalitarian regime
Noam Chomsky and others have criticized the legal decisions that led to the creation of the modern corporation:

Chomsky contends that corporations transfer policy decisions out of the hands of the people and into corporate boardrooms, where public oversight is limited. The extensive financial resources of corporations and the extent to which they're employed to influence political campaigns in the United States has also been implicated as a way in which corporations undermine the democratic institutions in a society.

Reception

"No other institution in American history—not even slavery—has ever been so consistently unpopular...with the American public. It was controversial from the outset, and it has remained controversial to this day."

John D. Rockefeller was one of the first to experience that paradox in a spectacular and personal way. By the last decade of the 19th century, Rockefeller found that he had become "the most hated man in the world."

Around the middle of the 20th century, the economist John Kenneth Galbraith noted that the corporate businesses which foreign visitors came to see and marvel at, as "showpiece[s] of American industrial achievement," were the very same ones that government attorneys scrutinized in their search for monopolistic wrongdoing.

See also
Multinational corporation#Criticism of multinationals
Big business#Criticism of big business
Corporate crime
Evil corporation

References

External links
CorpWatch, a corporation watchdog organisation

Corporations
 
Global issues